The European Champion Clubs Cup Cross Country is an annual cross country running competition between the European running clubs that are the reigning national champions for their country. It is often abbreviated to the name ECCC Cross Country. It is traditionally held on the first Sunday of February.

Organised by the European Athletics Association, it was first held in 1962,  making it the second oldest regional cross country event in the world (after the Balkan Cross Country Championships). Only the International Cross Country Championships and World Military Cross Country Championships are older than these two events. It also pre-dates the European Cross Country Championships (the international event) by over thirty years.

The competition was initially launched as a senior men only event, with a senior women's race being added to the programme twenty years later in 1982. Junior races for both men and women were initiated in 2006. Historically, the women's race was typically held at a separate location from the men's race. The two events have been held in conjunction since 2005 and each edition now features all four races (senior and junior) at the same venue. Reflecting the early roots of the tournament, until 2002 the United Kingdom sent four teams – one from each of its constituent countries. The event garners wide participation: in 2015 a total of 287 athletes competed across four races and clubs from 21 nations were present. The men's race is the most contested, with the field typically reaching 100 runners.

It is one of three annual athletics club competitions held by the European Athletics Association, alongside the European Champion Clubs Cup and European Champion Clubs Cup for Juniors in track and field.

The competition was staged in Belgium on all but one occasion up to 1980. Thereafter, it has been mostly held in the Iberian Peninsula and Italy, reflecting the prominence of the region in hosting elite level cross country meetings.

Rules and format
The eligible clubs for each race differ as each needs to have qualified through the respective national level competition – for example, only national junior women's club champions compete in the junior women's race. Each team race is scored by combining the finishing positions of a team's top four athletes. The team with the lowest cumulative score is the winner. Teams with fewer than four finishers are declared non-finishers. Medals are awarded for both the individual and team element of the competition. Non-point-scoring members of winning teams are recognised in the team ceremonies.

As a club-level competition, athletes of any nationality may compete in the competition as long as they are registered with an eligible European running club. However, athletes whose nationality is different from that of the country that their club is based in must be entered as a "Declared Foreign Athlete" in order to compete. This applies equally to non-European athletes and European athletes competing for a club of a different European nation.

The host venue for the event is decided by a host bidding process. The tournament has been held as a one-off sporting event for the host venue and also as an element to be incorporated into a long-standing cross country meeting – the annual Almond Blossom Cross Country race in Portugal has been host to the clubs cup competition on numerous occasions.

Editions

Men

Women

Combined

Junior winners

Statistics
Most successful clubs
Overall: Sporting Clube de Portugal, 17 titles
Men's: Sporting Clube de Portugal, 15 titles
Women's: Sporting Braga, 7 titles

Most successful athletes
Men's: Domingos Castro, 6 titles
Women's: Angela Tooby, 5 titles

References

List of venues and winners
European Champion Clubs Cup Cross Country: Venues & Winners. European Athletics (2013). Retrieved on 2015-02-28.
European Clubs Cross Country. GBR Athletics. Retrieved on 2015-02-28.

External links
Official page at European Athletics
2015 Official website
Video of 2014 event from European Athletics
Spain at the ECCC Cross Country from Spanish Athletics Federation

Clubs Cup
Cross country running competitions
Cross Country European
Athletics team events
Recurring sporting events established in 1962
February sporting events
1962 establishments in Europe